Fiction Weekly was an American literary magazine based in Lake Charles, Louisiana.  Fiction Weekly was conceived in the summer of 2008 by members of the McNeese State University MFA Program in creative writing.  As its name suggests, Fiction Weekly publishes on a weekly basis; it is published exclusively on the internet and features one previously unpublished piece of fiction on its front page each week.

Authors published in Fiction Weekly have appeared in anthologies such as New Stories From the South, have been nominated for the Pushcart Prize, and have been published in many other well reputed literary magazines including, Glimmer Train, The Pinch, and Harpur Palate.

However, as of May 2010, the website had not been updated for six months. It was stated that the magazine ceased publication.

Notable Contributors
Michael Knight, Anya Groner, Ryan Crider, Michelle Reed, Josh Canipe, and Paul Michel.

See also
List of literary magazines

References

External links
 Fiction Weekly (official website)

2008 establishments in Louisiana
Defunct literary magazines published in the United States
Fiction magazines
McNeese State University
Magazines established in 2008
Magazines disestablished in 2010
Magazines published in Louisiana
Mass media in Lake Charles, Louisiana
Weekly magazines published in the United States
Online literary magazines published in the United States